Outre-mers. Revue d'Histoire is a semi-annual French journal, founded in 1913 under the title Revue de l'histoire des colonies françaises. It publishes two double issues annually.

References

External links 
"Outre-Mers. Revue d'histoire", Persée.

Publications established in 1913
French-language journals
History journals